Polleke is a 2003 Dutch family film, based on the children's book by Guus Kuijer.

It received a Golden Film for 100,000 visitors.

The book Camera loopt... Actie! by Bibi Dumon Tak offers a look behind the scenes of making this film.

External links

2003 films
2000s Dutch-language films
Films based on children's books
2000s children's comedy films
Dutch children's films
2003 comedy films